Journey to Enlightenment is an album by saxophonist Carlos Garnett which was recorded in 1974 and released on the Muse label.

Track listing
All compositions by Carlos Garnett
 "Journey to Enlightenment" – 10:55
 "Love Flower" – 7:22
 "Chana" – 6:17
 "Caribbean Sun" – 6:18
 "Let Us Go (to Higher Heights)" – 6:15

Personnel
Carlos Garnett – reeds, ukulele, vocals
Reggie Lucas – guitar
Hubert Eaves – keyboards 
Anthony Jackson – bass 
Howard King – drums
Charles Pulliam – congas 
Ayodele Jenkins – vocals (tracks 1, 2 & 5)

References

Muse Records albums
Carlos Garnett albums
Jazz-funk albums
1974 albums